Olaf or Olav (or British ; Old Norse: Áleifr, Ólafr, Óleifr, Anleifr) is a Scandinavian and German given name. It is presumably of Proto-Norse origin, reconstructed as *Anu-laibaz, from anu "ancestor, grand-father" and laibaz "heirloom, descendant".
Old English forms are attested as Ǣlāf, Anlāf. The corresponding Old Novgorod dialect form is Uleb. A later English form of the name is Olave.

In the Norwegian language, Olav and Olaf are equally common, but Olav is traditionally used when referring to Norwegian royalty. The Swedish form is Olov or Olof, and the Danish form is Oluf. It was borrowed into Old Irish and Scots with the spellings Amlaíb and Amhlaoibh, giving rise to modern version Aulay.
The name is Latinized as Olaus.

Notable people

North Germanic
Denmark
Olaf I of Denmark, king 1086–1095
Olaf II of Denmark, also Olaf IV of Norway
Oluf Haraldsen (died c. 1143), Danish nobleman who ruled Scania for a few years from 1139
Norway
Olaf Haraldsson Geirstadalf, petty king 
Olaf I of Norway Tryggvason, 969 – 9 September 1000
Olaf II of Norway, or Saint Olaf, ruled 1015–1030
Olaf III of Norway, king 1067–1093
Olaf Magnusson (formerly IV) of Norway, 1103–1110
Olaf IV of Norway, king 1370 – 23 August 1387; was also Olaf II of Denmark
Sweden
Olaf of Sweden (disambiguation) (I, II and III)

Norse-Gaelic
Not all the following were strictly Norse-Gaels, but they share the most common Norse-Gaelic names.
 Olaf the Black, 13th-century Norse king
 Amlaíb Conung (King Olaf), King of Dublin, possibly identical with Olaf the White
 Olaf III Guthfrithson (Emlaíb mac Gofraid), King of Dublin
 Amlaíb Ua Donnubáin (Auliffe O'Donovan), regional Irish king

Mann and the Isles
 Olaf I of Mann, also called Olaf Godredsson (c. 1080–1153)
 Olaf II the Black, also called Olaf Godredsson (1173/4–1237), King of Mann and the Isles 1229–1237.

Novgorod Republic (in Ukraine or Kievan Rus')
 Uleb Ragnvaldsson, son of Ragnvald Ulfsson jarl of Staraja Ladoga (Aldeigjuborg), military leader of Novgorod Republic in conquering of Yugra in 1032.

Modern people

Given name
Olav V of Norway, king 1957–1991
Olaf Amundsen (1876–1939), Norwegian lawyer and politician
Olaf Fink (1914–1973), American educator and state senator
Olaf Lubaszenko, Polish actor
Olaf Pooley (1914–2015), English actor
Count Oluf of Rosenborg (1923–1990)
Olaf Scholz (born 1958), German politician
Olaf C. Seltzer (1877-1957), Danish-born American painter 
Olaf Stapledon (1886–1950), British author and historian
Oluf van Steenwinckel (died 1659), Danish building master and engineer

Middle name
Erwin Olaf (Erwin Olaf Springveld), Dutch photographer

Fictional characters
Count Olaf, a fictional character and the main antagonist in the series of novels A Series of Unfortunate Events by Lemony Snicket
Olaf, a fictional character in Jungle Jam and Friends: The Radio Show!
Olaf, a fictional anthropomorphic snowman in the 2013 film Frozen
Olaf, the Berserker, a character in the multiplayer online battle arena video game League of Legends
Olaf "the Stout", a fictional character in the video game series The Lost Vikings 
Olaf the Troll, a fictional character in  the TV series Buffy the Vampire Slayer
Olaf, one of Snoopy's siblings in Peanuts
Olaf Potato, a fictional anthropomorphic potato in the British animated short series Small Potatoes 
Olaf the Smug Anteater, a fictional character from Animal Crossing: New Leaf
Olaf the Lofty, a fictional inventor from Noggin the Nog
Agent Olaf, from Odd Squad (TV series)
Olaf (Agent Otto Jefferies), a fictional character from the Anita Blake series.
Olaf One-Eye, ancient High King of Skyrim from the video game series The Elder Scrolls.

Named animals
Nils Olav

Septs and clans
 McAuliffe (surname)
 Mac Amhlaoibh and Mac Amhalghaidh (Irish septs)
 Clan Macaulay of Lewis
 Clan MacAulay

See also

Aulay, the Anglicized Scottish form of the name
Ólafur, the Icelandic form of the name
Olavi, the Finnish form of the name
Olavo, the Portuguese form of the name
Ole and Oluf, the Danish forms of the name 
Ola and Olov, the Swedish forms of the name
Royal Norwegian Order of St. Olav

Masculine given names
Norwegian masculine given names
Swedish masculine given names
Finnish masculine given names
Danish masculine given names
Icelandic masculine given names
German masculine given names
Dutch masculine given names
Scandinavian masculine given names
Swiss masculine given names
fi:Uolevi